Several people are reported to have served as Chief of Staff of the Irish Republican Army in the organisations bearing that name.  Due to the clandestine nature of these organisations, this list is not definitive.

Chiefs of Staff of the Irish Republican Army (1917–1922)

From this point on, this lineage diverts to Chief of Staff of the Defence Forces

a.  Chairman of the Resident Executive

Chiefs of Staff of the (anti-Treaty) Irish Republican Army (1922–1969)

At an IRA General Army Convention held at Knockvicar House in Boyle, County Roscommon in December 1969, the IRA split into two factions, the majority Official IRA and the minority Provisional IRA.

Chiefs of Staff of the Provisional Irish Republican Army (1969–2005)

a.  Some noted Irish and British historians, including Ed Moloney, author of A Secret History of the IRA, have claimed that Gerry Adams has been part of the IRA leadership. Adams has always denied IRA membership, let alone being chief of staff.

b.  Although he admitted in his lifetime to IRA membership, he denied ever being Chief of Staff

Chiefs of Staff of the Official Irish Republican Army (1969–present)

a.   Hanley and Millar (2010) wrote: Goulding was "replaced by Garland after an Army Council vote in summer 1976. Long dismissive of the IRA's titles and formal military structure, Garland was reluctant to adopt the title of Chief of Staff; but he was now undoubtedly in charge".

Chiefs of Staff of the Continuity Irish Republican Army (1986–present)

Chiefs of Staff of the Real Irish Republican Army (1997–present)

See also
Irish Republican Army
IRA Quartermaster General
IRA Director of Intelligence

References

Irish Republican Army
Irish Republican Army members
Lists of Irish people